{{DISPLAYTITLE:C39H54N10O13S}}
The molecular formula C39H54N10O13S (molar mass: 902.97 g/mol, exact mass: 902.3593 u) may refer to:

 Amaninamide
 Gamma-Amanitin

Molecular formulas